Happy Hollow is an unincorporated community in eastern Washington County, in the U.S. state of Missouri. The community is located on Missouri Route 47 between Old Mines to the west and Cadet to the east.

The name "Happy Hollow" is commendatory.

References

Unincorporated communities in Washington County, Missouri
Unincorporated communities in Missouri